"Nothing Suits Me Like a Suit" is a song performed by Neil Patrick Harris and the cast of the comedy series How I Met Your Mother from the 100th episode "Girls Versus Suits". Carter Bays and Craig Thomas were nominated for the Primetime Emmy Award for Outstanding Original Music and Lyrics for writing the song.

Background
The song premiered on the 100th episode of How I Met Your Mother, "Girls Versus Suits" (season 5, episode 12) in a dream sequence where Harris' character, Barney Stinson, contemplates whether to keep his collection of suits or continue seeing the attractive bartender with whom he was about to hook up. The episode premiered on January 11, 2010, with the single being released the following day. Stacy Keibler guest-starred in this episode. The musical number featured 65 dancers and a 50-piece orchestra and was choreographed by Zach Woodlee (Glee).

Chart performance
The song peaked at #50 on the UK Singles Chart. In Canada, the song peaked at 76 on the Canadian Hot 100.

Charts

Personnel
 Lead vocals – Neil Patrick Harris as Barney Stinson
 Additional vocals – Jason Segel as Marshall Eriksen, Josh Radnor as Ted Mosby, Alyson Hannigan as Lily Aldrin, and Cobie Smulders as Robin Scherbatsky

References

2010 singles
2010 songs
How I Met Your Mother
American songs
Neil Patrick Harris songs
Songs from television series
Songs written by Carter Bays
Songs written by Craig Thomas (screenwriter)